Artesia Geyser is a geyser in the Lower Geyser Basin of Yellowstone National Park in the United States. Artesia Geyser is located on the edge of Firehole Lake and is part of the Black Warrior Group which includes Young Hopeful Geyser, Grey Bulger Geyser, and Steady Geyser.

Geology 
One vent is angled toward the boardwalk that passes the geyser and the other is angled toward Firehole Lake.

During a period in 1999, one of the vents jetted to a distance of  while the other emitted only steam.

In 2012, Artesia was having prominent, vertical eruptions about once a minute, with minimal activity between.  From 2014 to 2017, it was a low perpetual spouter only.  In summer 2018, Artesia resumed having prominent eruptions once a minute, with column heights reaching four to five meters high.

References

Geysers of Wyoming
Geothermal features of Teton County, Wyoming
Geothermal features of Yellowstone National Park
Geysers of Teton County, Wyoming